Belinea is a German manufacturer of PCs, notebooks and computer monitors.

History
The name Belinea was first used as a brand of computer monitors manufactured by Maxdata, which were primarily sold in Europe. The name first appeared in 1991. Belineas are known for their unique appearance with a big blue power button and three grey control buttons. Belinea model numbers are usually two-digit triplets, e.g. "10 20 20" (A 15" CRT model). Belinea monitors were market leader in Germany. Maxdata also manufactured computer units and notebook computers under the Belinea brand.

In June 2008, Maxdata, formerly Germany's largest computer manufacturer, filed for insolvency proceedings at the Local Court in Essen. The company had suffered a heavy decline in turnover and results. Despite a restructuring initiative introduced in 2006 the turnaround could not be achieved in 2007 or in the first half of 2008 leading to the winding up of proceedings.

After Maxdata fell into bankruptcy, German computer manufacturer and e-tailer Brunen IT Group bought the Belinea brand. In late 2008, Belinea GmbH, now a subsidiary of Brunen IT, was founded. Belinea GmbH continues to develop and manufacture new computers, notebooks and displays under the Belinea brand.

Brunen IT, the parent company of Belinea, was itself bought by Bluechip Computer AG, another German computer company.

External links
Belinea Website

Display technology
German brands